Enfances may refer to:

Enfances (essay), 1998 essay
Enfances (film), 2008 French film